Sněženky a machři po 25 letech  is a Czech comedy film. It was released in 2008.

Cast
 Jan Antonín Duchoslav 
 Michal Suchánek 
 Eva Jeníčková 
 Václav Kopta 
 Veronika Freimanová 
 Radoslav Brzobohatý 
 Juliana Johanidesová 
 Richard Genzer 
 Kateřina Neumannová

External links
 

2008 films
2008 comedy films
Czech comedy films
Czech sequel films
2000s Czech films